August Eisenmenger (11 February 1830 – 7 December 1907) was an Austrian painter of portraits and historical subjects.

Life 
He was born in Vienna. At the age of fifteen, Eisenmenger was already a student at the Academy of Fine Arts Vienna and won first prize in drawing. In 1848, his financial circumstances forced him to leave the Academy. He didn't find a secure position until he became a student/employee at Carl Rahl's studio in 1856.

In 1863, he became a drawing teacher at the Protestant School in Vienna. He eventually obtained a professorship at the Academy in 1872. He also established a private school where he taught Rahl's style of monumental painting. Rudolf Ernst was one of his best known pupils there.

He died in Vienna in 1907. In 1913, a street in Vienna's Döbling district was named after him. Later, that street was removed for an industrial site and a new street was dedicated to him in the Favoriten district in 1959.

One of Eisenmenger's sons, Victor Eisenmenger, was the personal physician to Archduke Franz Ferdinand.

Major works 
Apollo and the Nine Muses, ceiling panels in the Vienna Musikverein. 
The ceiling panels in the Grand Hotel. 
The Twelve Months, an oil panel at the Palais Gutmann 
Ancestral portraits and panels depicting episodes in the lives of Maximilian I and Leopold V; at Hernstein Castle. 
The frieze medallions at the Museum of Applied Arts, Vienna
Frieze medallions in the meeting room of the Chamber of Deputies in the Austrian Parliament Building.

Ceiling panels at the Musikverein

References

Further reading 
 Werner Kitlitschka: Die Malerei der Wiener Ringstraße. Verlag Steiner, Wiesbaden 1981, .
 Helga Tichy: August Eisenmenger 1830-1907. Ein Wiener Maler der Ringstraßenzeit. 2 Vols., unpublished thesis, Vienna 1997.

External links

 

1830 births
1907 deaths
Burials at the Vienna Central Cemetery
19th-century Austrian painters
Austrian male painters
19th-century Austrian male artists
Academic staff of the Academy of Fine Arts Vienna